The Spokane Comets were a minor professional ice hockey team that was located in Spokane, Washington. They played in the Western Hockey League (WHL) from 1958 to 1963.

In April 1961, the franchise considered a move to San Francisco in view of the financial loss of the last three years but after several meetings, it finally stayed in Spokane.

The 1962-63 team was coached by Roy McBride who piloted the team to a 30-38-2 record.

In June 1963 the Spokane franchise was purchased by a group led by the Toronto Maple Leafs of the National Hockey League which relocated them to become the Denver Invaders and act as their farm team. Spokane quickly generated the Spokane Jets, which commenced play in the Western International Hockey League  in the 1963–64 WIHL season.

The previous hockey team to play in Spokane had been the Spokane Flyers, who played in the senior amateur WIHL until the pro Flyers joined the WHL as the Spokane Spokes. The pro team's nickname was changed to the Comets in 1959–60.

Season-by-season records

Comets who played in the NHL
 Norm Beaudin
 Gilles Boisvert
 Gerry Brisson
 Don Cherry
 Roy Edwards
 Bill Folk
 Emile Francis
 Bill Johansen
 Earl Johnson
 Eddie Johnston
 Forbes Kennedy
 Connie Madigan
 Cesare Maniago
 Seth Martin
 Ernie Wakely
 Carl Wetzel
 Steve Witiuk

References

The Spokesman-Review - 6 Oct 1962
The Spokesman-Review - 8 Oct 1962
The Spokesman-Review - 8 Oct 1962
The Spokesman-Review - 8 Oct 1962
Spokane Daily Chronicle - 26 Nov 1962
Spokane Daily Chronicle - 26 Nov 1962
The Spokesman-Review - 21 Dec 1963

External links
The Hockey Internet Database: Spokane Comets (WHL)

Sports in Spokane, Washington
Defunct ice hockey teams in the United States
Ice hockey teams in Washington (state)
Western Hockey League (1952–1974) teams